Stroszek were a post-punk/new wave/electronic band from Aberdeen, Scotland, (latterly based in Glasgow). They comprised Richey James Roberto (voice, synth), Leslie Wilcox (guitar, synth, flute, programming), and Douglas Danielio (bass, synth, violin).

They released three EPs and a live single; Demo EP (2005), Demonstration EP (2007, self-produced), Manufacturing Consent EP (2008, Fire Exit Records), and Live in Stereo (2008, Threads of Sound). Artrocker described the band as "having fused the power of [The Clash and Joy Division] into an ambitious, inspiring art and aesthetic". The Skinny commented on the band's "mid-80s" sound on their Manufacturing Consent EP. SIC Magazine commented "no disrespect to the Manics but I think there is more to Stroszek than mere sloganeering"."Doug Daniel’s 'wrought iron’ basslines must be the safest place in the world for a sensitive soul to hide while Les Willox’s minimalist guitar licks are borderline erotic. Stroszek repeatedly remind us of the difference between good lyrics and obvious lyrics."

The band split up in 2014.

Discography
Demo EP (2005)
Demonstration EP (2007)
Manufacturing Consent EP (2008), Fire Exit Records
Live in Stereo (2009), Threads of Sound

References

Musical groups from Glasgow
Post-punk revival music groups
Scottish electronic music groups
Musical groups established in 2005
Musical groups disestablished in 2009